Puinawai Natural Reserve is the second-largest national park in Colombia. This protected area occupies  of the Amazon Region of Colombia, roughly 15% of the Guainía Department. The Reserve was created in September 1989 and coincides with three important indigenous territories that were also formed at the same time. Several rivers cross the Natural Reserve belonging to the Amazon River basin: The Cuyari, Isana and Guainía River. And belonging to the Orinoco River basin, the Inírida River.

Ecosystem 
The area of the Puinawai Natural Reserve mainly consists of humid tropical rainforest. However, there are also tropical open savanna and transitional zones. Pressure from deforestation has so far remained relatively small, due to its inaccessibility and low population density. According to Colombia's national park services, 1% of Puinawai has been deforested.

There are 419 endemic plant species in the natural reserve, 176 of which are endemic in the whole Guyana Shield. The reserve is also rich in fauna with many local species that were preserved also due to the local indigenous tribes practicing a sustainable co-existence with the local environment. The Puinawai Natural Reserve is not open to the public.

References 

National parks of Colombia
Protected areas established in 1989
1989 establishments in Colombia
Geography of Guainía Department